Namanga may refer to:

 Namanga, a town in Kajiado district, Kenya
 Namanga Hills, a mountain in southern Kenya
 Namanga (Tanzanian ward), a ward in Longido district, Arusha region, Tanzania